The Investec Cup was a golf tournament on the Sunshine Tour. It was played annually in March at Millvale Private Retreat in Koster, South Africa. Similar to the PGA Tour's Tour Championship, the Investec Cup had a 16-man field determined by the Chase to the Investec Cup standings. Points were earned in all Sunshine Tour events, beginning immediately after the previous Investec Cup. While the tournament's prize fund is a winner-take-all, R 250,000, a bonus pool of R 10,000,000 is distributed to the top finishers in the Chase, with the winner of the Chase taking R 4,000,000.

For the first three years, the tournament had a field of 30 players and was played over two courses, with the Millvale Private Retreat joined by the Lost City Golf Course in Sun City.

Winners

References

External links
Coverage at the Sunshine Tour's official site

Former Sunshine Tour events
Golf tournaments in South Africa
Sport in North West (South African province)